Shovot District (/, شاۋات تۇمەنى) is a district of Xorazm Region in Uzbekistan. The capital lies at the town Shovot. The district consists of 5 urban-type settlements (Shovot, Boʻyrochi, Ipakchi, Kangli, Qat-qalʻa, Monoq, Chigʻatoy) and 11 rural communities.

References

Xorazm Region
Districts of Uzbekistan